The St George Continental Cycling Team is an Australian road cycling team, founded in 2015 at domestic level. In 2016 the team acquired a UCI Continental licence.

Team roster

Major results
2018
Overall Tour of Thailand, Benjamin Dyball
Mountains classification, Benjamin Dyball
Stage 3, Benjamin Dyball
Overall Tour de Siak, Matthew Zenovich
Stage 1, Matthew Zenovich
Stage 2, Benjamin Dyball
Overall Tour de Ijen, Benjamin Dyball
Stage 1, Marcus Culey
Stage 4, Benjamin Dyball
Prologue & Stage 4 Tour of Taihu Lake, Dylan Kennett
Stage 5 Tour de Singkarak, Ryan Cavanagh
Stage 7 Tour de Singkarak, Jay Dutton

2019
Overall The Princess Maha Chakri Sirindhorn's Cup, Ryan Cavanagh
Stage 3, Ryan Cavanagh
Young rider classification Tour de Kumano, Corbin Strong
Young rider classification Tour de Korea, Corbin Strong
Overall Tour of Taihu Lake, Dylan Kennett
Stage 3, Dylan Kennett
Overall Tour of Quanzhou Bay, Ryan Cavanagh
Points classification, Ryan Cavanagh

2020
Stage 5 New Zealand Cycle Classic, Dylan Kennett
Stage 2 Tour de Taiwan, Ryan Cavanagh

2022
Stage 3 New Zealand Cycle Classic, Nick Kergozou

References

External links

Cycling teams based in Australia
UCI Continental Teams (Oceania)
2015 establishments in Australia
Cycling teams established in 2015